Lake Walsh is a fresh water body crossed to the west on  by the discharge current from Fragasso Lake in Jacques-Cartier National Park. This lake is located entirely in the unorganized territory of Lac-Jacques-Cartier, in the La Côte-de-Beaupré Regional County Municipality, administrative region of Capitale-Nationale, in province of Quebec, in Canada.

The Walsh Lake watershed is mainly served on the east side by the route 175 which links the towns of Quebec and Saguenay. A few secondary roads serve this area for forestry and recreational tourism activities, notably forest road 12 which runs north of the lake and in the area between Fragasso Lake and lac Walsh.

Forestry is the main economic activity in the sector; recreational tourism, second.

The surface of lake Walsh is generally frozen from early December to late March; safe circulation on the ice is generally done from the end of December to the beginning of March.

Geography 

From there, the current goes up on  towards the north, to join the current coming from the discharge of the Rocheuse River (coming from the north). Then, the current from the latter crosses  to the west of the Lac des Alliés to its mouth.

Toponymy 
The name "Walsh" is a family name of English origin.

The toponym "Lac Walsh" was formalized on June 1, 1971, by the Commission de toponymie du Québec.

See also 

 Jacques-Cartier National Park
 La Côte-de-Beaupré Regional County Municipality
 Lac-Jacques-Cartier, an unorganized territory
 Rocky River
 Rivière du Malin
 Jacques-Cartier River
 List of lakes of Canada

Notes and references

Bibliography 
 

Lakes of Capitale-Nationale
Rivers of Capitale-Nationale
La Côte-de-Beaupré Regional County Municipality